The Australian Open is a Grand Slam tennis tournament held annually in Melbourne, Australia at the Melbourne & Olympic Parks grounds. Since 1969, the tournament became open to professionals, so it is now called the Australian Open. The senior men's and women's tournaments are open to any player with a world ranking, although players below number 100 in the world rankings generally have to enter a preliminary qualification tournament or receive a wildcard to gain entry.

The men who have reached the final at least four times in the Open Era are Mats Wilander, Ivan Lendl, Stefan Edberg, Andre Agassi, Roger Federer, Novak Djokovic, Andy Murray, and Rafael Nadal. Wilander reached the final four times, three times while the event was held on grass and once on hard courts. He won the title twice on grass and once on the other surface. Lendl also reached the final four times, once on grass and three times on hard courts. Both of his titles were on the latter surface. Edberg made the final five times, twice on grass and three times on hard courts. Both of his titles were on grass. Agassi was undefeated in his four appearances in the final between 1995 and 2003, which all on hard courts. Federer has reached the final seven times and won the title six times, all on hard courts, which the first three was on Rebound Ace and the last three on Plexicushion surface. Djokovic is a record ten-time finalist, winning all of his appearances in the finals. Murray is a five-time finalist, but lost all of those appearances. Nadal reached six finals, winning twice.

The women who have reached the final at least four times in the Open Era are Margaret Court, Evonne Goolagong Cawley, Chris Evert, Martina Navratilova, Steffi Graf, Monica Seles, Martina Hingis, Serena Williams, and Maria Sharapova. Court reached the final and won the title four times between 1969 and 1973. Goolagong Cawley reached the final seven times between 1971 and 1977, winning four titles. Evert reached the final six times between 1974 and 1988, five on grass and once on hard courts. Both of her titles were on grass. All of Navratilova's six finals between 1975 and 1987 were on grass, with her winning three titles. Graf reached five finals, all on hard courts, between 1987 and 1994. She won four of those finals. Seles was undefeated in her four finals between 1991 and 1996, all on hard courts. Hingis reached six consecutive finals on hard courts between 1997 and 2002, winning three times. Williams played eight finals since 2003, all on hard courts, with three on Rebound Ace and the last five finals on Plexicushion. She won her first six finals as well as her eighth. In her four final appearances since 2007, Sharapova won the title in 2008.

Men

During the 55 times that this tournament has been held in the Open Era, 55 men have reached the Australian Open men's singles final. The final has included men from 20 different nationalities. Twelve of the 55 men have been from the United States, and eleven have been from Australia. Other countries well represented include Serbia, Switzerland, Sweden, Spain, Russia, the United Kingdom, South Africa, Germany, France, Czechoslovakia, and Chile.
* = Champion

Most recent final

Multiple-time opponents in the Open Era
In 2016, Novak Djokovic and Andy Murray reached the same final for an unprecedented fourth time in six years; no other pair of players have contested more than two Australian Open finals in the Open era, and only the four finals between Roger Federer and Rafael Nadal at the French Open matches the record in any of the other Slams during the Open era.

Most consecutive finals in the Open Era

Bolded years^ indicates active or current streak

Women

During the 55 times that this tournament has been held in the Open Era, 50 women have reached the Australian Open women's singles final. The final has included women from 20 different nationalities. Fifteen of the 48 women have been from the United States, and seven have been from Australia. Other countries well represented include Germany, Czechoslovakia, France, Russia, Spain, Belgium, China, and Belarus.
* = Champion

Most recent final

Multiple-time opponents in the Open Era

Most consecutive finals in the Open Era

Bolded years^ indicates active or current streak

See also

List of French Open singles finalists during the Open Era
List of Wimbledon singles finalists during the Open Era
List of US Open singles finalists during the Open Era

Notes
 Johan Kriek was born in South Africa but became a United States citizen in 1982.
 Martina Navratilova was born in Czechoslovakia but lost her citizenship in 1975. She became a United States citizen in 1981. Her Czech citizenship was restored in 2008.
 Monica Seles was born in Yugoslavia but became a United States citizen in 1994.

References

External links
ATP tournament profile

Open Era